Physaleae is a tribe of flowering plants in the subfamily Solanoideae of the family Solanaceae.

Genera

Subtribe Iochrominae
Acnistus Schott
Dunalia Kunth
Iochroma Benth.
Saracha Ruiz & Pav.
Vassobia Rusby
Subtribe Physalinae
Alkekengi Mill.
Brachistus Miers
Calliphysalis Whitson
Chamaesaracha (A.Gray) Benth.
Leucophysalis Rydb.
Oryctes S.Watson
Physalis L.
Quincula Raf.
Tzeltalia E.Estrada & M.Martínez
Witheringia L'Hér.
Subtribe Withaninae
Athenaea Sendtn.
Aureliana Sendtn.
Discopodium Hochst.
Mellissia Hook.f.
Nothocestrum A.Gray
Tubocapsicum (Wettst.) Makino
Withania Pauquy
incertae sedis
Cuatresia Hunz.
Deprea Raf.
Larnax Miers

References

External links

 
Asterid tribes